Pomme de Terre State Park is a state park in the U.S. state of Missouri consisting of  located on Pomme de Terre Lake in Hickory County. The park features a marina, campgrounds, swimming beaches, and hiking trails.

References

External links
Pomme de Terre State Park Missouri Department of Natural Resources 
Pomme de Terre State Park Map Missouri Department of Natural Resources

State parks of Missouri
Protected areas of Hickory County, Missouri
Protected areas established in 1960